Ross Greenwood (born 29 June 1959) is an Australian print and television journalist and radio presenter, reporting on business and finance

Journalism 
Greenwood has been the editor of numerous business publications, including Personal Investment (1986–1997), Business Review Weekly (1997–1999) and Shares, an Australian magazine he co-founded.

Media career 
On television, Greenwood has appeared on Healthy, Wealthy and Wise from 1992 to 1997. In 1999 he moved to London and was founding editor of Shares Magazine, as well as being a regular presenter on BBC Five Live's Wake Up to Money program) CNN, Sky News and Bloomberg Television. He joined the Nine Network in Australia in 2003, to be the Business & Finance Editor.

In 2006, Greenwood and Ellen Fanning replaced Jana Wendt as co-hosts of the Sunday program. Greenwood was then replaced by Ray Martin but at the start of 2008 Martin resigned from the Nine Network.

Between 2003 and 2019 Greenwood was the Nine Network's Business and Finance Editor, and appeared on Today, Nine News, 60 Minutes and A Current Affair.

He also presented Money News on 2GB Sydney, between 6pm and 8pm each day. The program was networked to 3AW Melbourne, 4BC Brisbane, 2CC Canberra and various regional networks.

In January 2021, Greenwood joined Sky News Australia as Business Editor.

Greenwood is best remembered in 2015 for encouraging Australian Rules Football fans to racially vilify indigenous football star Adam Goodes by booing him at games.

External links
 Personal website

1969 births
Living people
Nine News presenters
Australian financial analysts
Australian television journalists
BBC newsreaders and journalists
Australian television talk show hosts
Former 2GB presenters